The Afrikaner Party (AP) was a South African political party from 1941 to 1951.

Origins
The Afrikaner Party's roots can be traced back to September 1939, when South Africa declared war on Germany shortly after the start of World War II. The then Prime Minister J.B.M. Hertzog and his followers did not agree with this move and broke away from the United Party to form the Volksparty (People's Party).

The Volksparty later split: one faction joined the Gesuiwerde Nasionale Party (Purified National Party) to form the Herenigde Nasionale Party (Re-united National Party) while the other faction became the Afrikaner Party under the leadership of N.C. Havenga.

Coalition
After the 1948 South African general election the Herenigde National Party and Afrikaner Party formed a coalition in order to achieve an absolute majority in parliament. The Afrikaner Party was very much the junior partner in this, however, and in 1951, the two parties amalgamated to become the National Party.

Election results

References

Winkler Prins Encyclopedie 1955, deur: red. Winkler Prins.
Nuwe Geskiedenis van Suid-Afrika: T. Cameron. 1986, Human & Rousseau.

1941 establishments in South Africa
1951 disestablishments in Africa
Afrikaner nationalism
Afrikaner organizations
Boer nationalism
Defunct political parties in South Africa
Nationalist parties in South Africa
Political parties disestablished in 1951
Political parties established in 1941
Political parties of minorities
Protestant political parties
Separatism in South Africa
White nationalist parties